Can Coşkun (born 28 March 1998) is a professional footballer who plays for FSV Zwickau. Born in Germany, he has represented Turkey at youth level.

Career

Club career
After starting out as a youth at Hertha BSC, F.C. Hansa Rostock and Dynamo Dresden, he moved to Regionalliga Nordost club Berliner AK 07 in the summer of 2017, where he also made his first senior appearances. After one season he moved to Regionalliga Bayern club SV Wacker Burghausen. During the following winter break, he moved to SpVgg Greuther Fürth II.

In January 2020 he moved to 3. Liga club FSV Zwickau. Here, he made his first professional appearance when he came on for Nils Miatke  in the 54th minute of the game on 25 January 2020, in a 2-1 away win against 1. FC Magdeburg.

References

External links

Living people
1998 births
Association football defenders
German footballers
Turkish footballers
Turkey youth international footballers
Footballers from Berlin
Hertha BSC players
FC Hansa Rostock players
Dynamo Dresden players
Berliner AK 07 players
SV Wacker Burghausen players
SpVgg Greuther Fürth II players
FSV Zwickau players
3. Liga players
Regionalliga players